Michael Barclay may refer to:

Michael Barclay de Tolly (1761–1818), German-Russian military commander
Michael Barclay, character in Adventure in Diamonds
Mike Barclay, musician in Boots for Dancing

See also
Michael Berkeley (born 1948), English composer